Dance Into Happiness is a 1930 German musical film directed by Max Nosseck and starring Ilse Stobrawa, Fred Doederlein and Lotte Hané.

Cast
 Ilse Stobrawa as Lotte Hübner
 Fred Doederlein
 Lotte Hané as Frau Hübner
 Alwin Neuß as Richard Grothe
 Heinrich Gotho as Oskar Hübner, Briefträger
 Liselotte Schaak as Lizzi Brandt
 Julius E. Hermann as Mr. Brown, Grammophonfabrikant
 Max Nosseck as Goliath Wellenschlag, Tierzüchter
 Claire Reigbert

References

Bibliography

External links 
 

1930 films
1930 musical films
German musical films
Films of the Weimar Republic
1930s German-language films
Films directed by Max Nosseck
German black-and-white films
1930s German films